This is a timeline of African American Children's literature milestones in the United States from 1600 – present. The timeline also includes selected events in Black history and children's book publishing broadly.

17th century

1619
The first record of Africans in English colonial America when men were brought at first to Fort Monroe off the coast of Hampton, Virginia, and then to the Jamestown colony.

18th century
1761
Jupiter Hammon is known as a founder of African-American literature. His poem, "An Evening Thought: Salvation by Christ, with Penitential Cries," was published as a broadside in 1761, establishing Hammon as the first published African American poet.
 
1773
Phillis Wheatley, the first African-American author of a published book of poetry, publishes Poems on Various Subjects, Religious and Moral.

1776–1783 The American Revolution

19th century
1847
Frederick Douglass begins publication of the abolitionist newspaper the North Star.

1852  
 Harriet Beecher Stowe publishes the anti-slavery novel, Uncle Tom's Cabin, in 1852.  Josiah Henson, is the inspiration for one of the book's main characters.

1853
Clotel; or, The President's Daughter by William Wells Brown is the first novel published by an African-American.

1859
Harriet E. Wilson writes the autobiographical novel Our Nig.

1861
The American Civil War begins on April 12 and lasts until April 9, 1865.

1865
The Thirteenth Amendment to the United States Constitution prohibits slavery except as punishment for crime.

1868
Elizabeth Keckly publishes Behind the Scenes (or, Thirty Years a Slave and Four Years in the White House).

1884
Mark Twain's Adventures of Huckleberry Finn is published, featuring the enslaved African-American character Jim.

1887
 Amelia E. Johnson publishes Joy, an eight-page, monthly magazine for African American children.

1892
Ida B. Wells publishes her pamphlet Southern Horrors: Lynch Law in All Its Phases.

1899
The Story of Little Black Sambo, written and illustrated by Scottish author Helen Bannerman, is published. The book, which would become popular around the world, presents a negative and stereotypical image of Black people.

20th century

1900–1949
1901
Booker T. Washington's autobiography Up from Slavery is published.

1903
W. E. B. Du Bois's seminal work The Souls of Black Folk is published.

1909
The National Negro Committee meets and is formed; it will be the precursor to the National Association for the Advancement of Colored People (NAACP), an interracial group devoted to civil rights.

1913
Mary White Ovington, a white co-founder of the NAACP, publishes Hazel, a novel about a middle-class Black child.

1919
Children's Book Week is established in the United States.
Louise Seaman Bechtel is hired by Macmillan as the first children's book editor in the first US department devoted solely to publishing children's books.

1920
W.E.B. DuBois publishes The Brownies’ Books, a monthly magazine for African American children that includes fiction, poetry, and world events. Author and teacher Jessie Redmon Fauset is the editor.

1926
Historian Carter G. Woodson proposes Negro History Week.

1927
 Charlemae Hill Rollins is hired by the Chicago Public Library as a children's librarian. She would later write We Build Together: A Reader's Guide to Negro Life and Literature for Elementary and High School Use, a bibliography of books with positive representations of African Americans.

1928
Claude McKay's Home to Harlem wins the Harmon Gold Award for Literature.

1928
Popo and Fifina: Children of Haiti is the first children's novel by and about Blacks. The authors are Arna Bontemps and Langston Hughes. Cartoonist E. Simms Campbell is the illustrator.

1936
The American Booksellers Association establishes the National Book Awards.

1937
Zora Neale Hurston writes the novel Their Eyes Were Watching God
 Augusta Braxton Baker is hired as the children's librarian for the New York Public Library. Under her direction, the James Weldon Johnson Collection is established to promote books with positive portrayals of African Americans.

1938
 The Caldecott Medal, named for Randolph Caldecott, a nineteenth-century English illustrator, is established to honor the artists of the most distinguished American picture book for children.

1940
Hattie McDaniel becomes the first African-American to win an Academy Award for Best Supporting Actress for her performance as Mammy in Gone with the Wind.

1945
Jesse C. Jackson's Call Me Charley is the first contemporary children's novel with a Black protagonist.
 Two is a Team, an interracial friendship story, by Lorraine and Jerrold Beim, is illustrated by Ernest Crichlow. This is the first picture book illustrated by an African American artist.

1947
John Hope Franklin authors the non-fiction book From Slavery to Freedom.

1950–1999
1951
Little Brown Koko, a series of short stories illustrating Black characters in a stereotypical manner are introduced in a book collection by Blanche Seale Hunt.

1952
Ralph Ellison authors the novel Invisible Man which wins the National Book Award.

1953
 The Jane Addams Children's Book Awards for books that best promote peace, social justice, world community, equality of the sexes and all races is established.

1954
The U.S. Supreme Court rules against the "separate but equal" doctrine in Brown v. Board of Education of Topeka, Kans.

1955
 Rosa Parks refuses to give up her seat on a bus, starting the Montgomery bus boycott.

1956
Arna W. Bontemps receives the Jane Addams Children's Book Award for Story of the Negro. He is the first African American to receive the award.

1958
Publication of Here I Stand, Paul Robeson's manifesto-autobiography.

1959
 Motown Records is founded by Berry Gordy.
A Raisin in the Sun, a play by Lorraine Hansberry, debuts on Broadway.

1960
Ruby Bridges becomes the first African American child to attend an all-white elementary school in the South (William Frantz Elementary School) following court-ordered integration in New Orleans, Louisiana. This event was portrayed by Norman Rockwell in his 1964 painting The Problem We All Live With.

1962
The picture book The Snowy Day, written and illustrated by Ezra Jack Keats is published. It is regarded as the first picture book to portray an African American child as a protagonist.

1963
 The March on Washington for Jobs and Freedom is held. Martin Luther King Jr. gives his I Have a Dream speech.

1964
 Whitney Young, Jr., National Urban League executive director, criticizes American book publishers in an August 22 syndicated article titled “NYC's ‘Segregated Zoo’” for omitting African Americans from children's books.
 The Council on Interracial Books for Children is founded in response to the lack of ethnically diverse books available to Mississippi's Freedom Schools.

1965
Nancy Larrick, former president of the International Reading Association, publishes “The All-White World of Children's Books” in the Saturday Review. Larrick is critical of publishers for their lack of African American characters in children's books. As evidence, Larrick analyzed more than 5,000 children's books published between 1962 and 1964 and identifies only 40 with illustrations or text related to contemporary African Americans.
 The Council on Interracial Books for Children is founded to promote nonwhite authors through book reviews, awards, and other tactics.

1966
 Nichelle Nichols is cast as a female black officer on television's Star Trek.

1967
The first Boston Globe - Horn Book Award for excellence in children's and young adult literature is presented.

1969
The Coretta Scott King Book Awards are established to honor outstanding Black authors and illustrators of children and young adult books.

1971
Ernest J. Gaines's Reconstruction-era novel The Autobiography of Miss Jane Pittman is published.

1972
Tom Feelings is the first African American to win a Caldecott Honor Award for illustrating Moja Means One: A Swahili Counting Book.

1973
Ebony Jr.!, a monthly children's magazine, is launched by the Johnson Publishing Company with John H. Johnson as publisher and Constance Van Brunt Johnson as editor.

1974
African American illustrator Tom Feelings and author Muriel Feelings win the Boston Globe–Horn Book Award for picture books Jambo Means Hello: Swahili Alphabet Book.
 The Carter G. Woodson Book Award is established to honor exemplary books written for ethnic minority children and young people in the United States. The award is given by the National Council Social Studies Annual Conference.

1975
Virginia Hamilton is the first African American to win the Newbery Medal for M.C. Higgins, the Great.

1976
 The novel Roots: The Saga of an American Family by Alex Haley is published.
 Leo and Diane Dillon are the first illustrators of color to win a Caldecott Medal Award for illustrating Why Mosquitoes Bizz in People's Ears.

1977
 Mildred D. Taylor's Roll of Thunder, Hear My Cry wins the Newbery Medal.

1980
 The Council on Interracial Books for Children publishes a checklist of Ten Quick Ways to Analyze Children's Books for Sexism and Racism.

1982
 Michael Jackson releases Thriller, which becomes the best-selling album of all time.
 Rudine Sims Bishop publishes in Shadow and Substance: Afro-American Experience in Contemporary Children's Fiction the findings from a survey of images and representations in Black children's literature published between 1965 and 1980.

1985
The Cooperative Children's Book Center, School of Education at the University of Wisconsin – Madison begins annual documentation of the number of books published in the United States for children which are written and/or illustrated by African Americans.

1986
Established by legislation in 1983, Martin Luther King Jr. Day on January 20 is first celebrated as a national holiday in the United States.
 Valerie Flournoy, author of The Patchwork Quilt, illustrated by Jerry Pinkney, wins the Ezra Jack Keats New Writer Award.

1988
Just Us Books, a publishing house focused on African American children and young adult books, is founded by Wade and Cheryl Hudson.

1991
Tom Low and Philip Lee co-found Lee & Low Books, a multicultural children's book publisher in the United States.

1992
 The African American Children's Book Fair started in Philadelphia by Vanesse Lloyd-Sgambati.

1995
The Million Man March in Washington, D.C., is co-initiated by Louis Farrakhan and James Bevel.

1996
 The NAACP Image Award for Outstanding Literary Work, Children's is established.

21st century

2000–the Present
2006
The Cybils Awards are founded by children's book and young adult literature bloggers to honor books with literary merit and kid appeal.

2007
The Brown Bookshelf blog, to promote African American picture books, Middle Grade and Young Adult novels written and illustrated by African Americans. Each year the blog hosts 28 Days Later, a daily feature during Black History Month featuring Black authors and illustrators.

2008
 Barack Obama is elected 44th President of the United States of America, the first African-American to become president.

2009
Ashley Bryan is the first African American to receive the Laura Ingalls Wilder Award honoring an author or illustrator, published in the United States

2010
 The Walt Disney Company crowns its first African-American Disney Princess, Tiana.
Educators Sandra Hughes-Hassell and Ernie J. Cox publish Inside Board Books: Representations of People of Color in The Library Quarterly.

2014
Author Walter Dean Myers writes in a March 16 New York Times an opinion piece titled “Where are the People of Color in Children's Books.”  His son Christopher Myers writes a companion piece titled “The Apartheid of Children's Literature."
A panel titled “Blockbuster Reads: Meet the Kids Authors That Dazzle” featuring only white men at the inaugural BookCon conference in New York City ignites widespread criticism and outcry for more diversity in children's book publishing.
The social media hashtag #WeNeedDiverseBooks is launched.

2015
Publisher Lee & Low Books partner with St. Catherine University (St. Paul, MN) to initiate The Diversity Baseline Survey, an industry study to uncover publishing and reviewer employment statistics in the areas of gender, race/ethnicity, sexual orientation, and disability.
2022

 Social Entrepreneur and Children's Book Author Veronica N. Chapman launches Black Children's Book Week, a week dedicated to celebrating Black children and the people who make sure they are represented in children's books.

See also

References

External links
 Children's Picture Book Database at Miami University

African American-related lists
African-American children's literature
African-American literature